This is a list of athletics results at the 2019 Island Games, held at the Lathbury Sports Complex, Gibraltar in July 2019.

Medal table

Results

Men

Women

References 

Island Games
Athletics
2019
Athletics in Gibraltar